Turku Synagogue in the city of Turku is one of the two synagogues in Finland. Located in the VII District, the synagogue is used by the Jewish community of Turku. The synagogue building, designed by architects August Krook and J.E. Hindersson, was completed in 1912.

References

See also 
Helsinki Synagogue
Vyborg Synagogue

Ashkenazi Jewish culture in Finland
Ashkenazi synagogues
Buildings and structures in Turku
Synagogues in Finland
Synagogues completed in 1912
1912 establishments in Finland
Art Nouveau synagogues